Lourdes Grobet Argüelles (25 July 1940 – 15 July 2022) was a Mexican contemporary photographer, known for her photographs of Mexican lucha libre wrestlers.

Grobet spent some time as a painter before focussing on photography. Her photography led her to explore lucha libre, and she spent a lot of time getting to know the luchadores (wrestlers). Grobet did some theatre and video, and published several books. Grobet's work has been the subject of numerous exhibitions, and she received many grants and awards for her work.

Early life 
Grobet was born in México City, where she grew up with her parents. Grobet took a formal painting class at the Academy of San Carlos. Her parents did not like the views of the school and sent her to work under a Catholic professor named José Suárez Olvera, who painted murals for the Church of San Francisco. She did not care for his work much because she felt it lacked originality. Grobet asked herself what art is: “Looking around, and after asking myself the inevitable questions about what art is, it became clear that for me it was a language, a way of saying things, and so I had to find the best way of saying them.”

Education 
Grobet studied plastic arts at the Universidad Iberoamericana in Mexico and graphic design and photography in Britain at the Cardiff College of Art and Derby College for Higher Education. She was very moved by her professor Mathias Goeritz, from whom she learned that mass media showed a new way of expression. When Goeritz gave up teaching, he asked Grobet to be his assistant while he worked on stained glassed windows for the México City Cathedral. She studied in England in 1977 and did a few landscape paintings. She ended up failing, however, because the photography faculty did not like that she altered the landscape and strayed away from keeping it purely documentary.

Career 
Kati Horna introduced Grobet to the world of photography, though the main influences in her early career were Mathias Goeritz, Gilberto Aceves Navarro, El Santo and others.

Grobet studied as a painter in Mexico for some time and then took a trip to Paris in 1968; it changed her life and the way that she viewed the art world.

While she was in Paris, Grobet visited many art galleries and discovered kinetic art; because of this, she liked working with multimedia. She spent some time working at a jazz concert, controlling lighting and kinetic projections. When Grobet returned to Mexico, she decided that she wanted to focus on photography; after she got back home, she decided to burn all of her old work and start over.

In 1981 Grobet released her first set of photographs. At the beginning of her career in photography, she was part of a group called Consejo Mexicano de Fotografía (Mexican Council of Photography), formed by Pedro Meyer in 1977. With her participation in this group, she was able to revitalize photography in Mexico, which led to a movement called the Grupos. Grobet was focused on establishing a community-based perspective.

Grobet spent some time with indigenous people during a time of great struggle for them. She took the time to learn more about them and photograph them in a theatrical way. She wanted to relate to indigenous people using her artistic initiative, so they made costumes and scenery of their own and she then took their photos. Later on, Grobet took interest in the Mayan culture. Wanting to learn more about the Mayans she went to the suburbs; while this was not a common thing to do, she wanted to steer clear of any tourists. She wanted to get accurate information about the people she documented and explore an area less traveled. She discovered temples that were made by an unknown civilization and she decided they were to be called the Olmayazetec.

After her education and her travels, Grobet came back to México City. She once again started to explore her childhood interest of luchadores. She found that there was very little information pertaining to the luchadores, and so she decided that she wanted to make them more known to the world.

Grobet spent thirty years devoted to taking pictures of the luchadores and studying their way of life. She spent time photographing lucha libre wrestlers inside and outside of the ring, both in their masks, but also in their own homes. Grobet wanted to show that they lived normal lives, just like everyone else. She got very close with well known Lucha Libre wrestlers such as: El Santo, Blue Demon, Mil Mascaras, Sagrada, Octagon, Misioneros de la Muerte, Los Perros del Mal, and Los Brazos. Influenced greatly by Mathias Goeritz, the Polish sculptor from Gdańsk, and by Gilberto Aceves Navarro, a Mexican master of art murals, who were her teachers, Grobet worked on pictures of El Santo, one of the most important Mexican wrestlers, and a hero of lucha libre who starred in more than 50 films. Since 1975, she has published more than  photographs of the sport, including those on the sport in the United States since the 1930s, and as an important part of Mexican popular culture, adopting a sociological attitude. The sport involves many costumes and masks, leading it to a sport-carnival air which is much appreciated by Mexicans.

She also ventured into cinema. In her 2013 movie Bering. Balance and Resistance, Grobet questions the political separation between the Big Diomede Island (Russia) and the Little Diomede Island (USA) in the Bering Strait, a border between the United States and Russia. Showing the consequences of the separation between both Islands. After the American-Soviet conflict of the 21st century, the Beringia region was divided in two, which caused the separation of complete Nanook families and also, paradoxically, separated the place where the first human beings that populated the American continent crossed. 

Grobet has had over one hundred exhibitions of her photographs, both group and solo exhibitions. She had her work exhibited at the London Mexfest festival in 2012. She won an award at the Second Biennal in Fine Art Photography. In 1975, for the exhibition Hora y media, she transformed a gallery into a photographic laboratory. She developed the photographs, but without fixing them, and displayed them on three walls. While the public looked at the photographs, the lights from the gallery made it look like they disappeared.

In 1977, Grobet presented Travelling, an exhibition of photography on an escalator. Among her other works were Paisajes pintados, Teatro campesino, Strip Tease.

Personal life 
Grobet married Xavier Perez Barba in 1962 and they had four children together. They divorced in 1974.

Death
Grobet died on 15 July 2022 in México City.

Work and process 
As Grobet was taking her photographs, she desired to understand reality better. According to Grobet, and as noted in her 2005 book Lourdes Grobet, "she has used this photographic experience as an inductive process in order to understand or 'live' reality (or realities) rather than illustrate certain preconceived ideas. She is not scared to employ different (sometimes contradictory) languages available to her to speak of her particular experience and standpoint, thus sacrificing formal purism. In her own way, Grobet manages to use photography to relate to herself, to relate to us and to take action in the problematic reality that is Mexico."

Some of Grobet's work was collaborative, while others she liked to do on her own time. When photographing the luchadores she wanted to show their tough side, but she also wanted to show their fragile side as well. Grobet wanted to uncover the roots of the lucha libre. She wanted to show that the lucha libre is important to the culture of Mexico, with links back to the time of the Aztecs. Grobet found that there was not much information about these fascinating luchadores. She wanted the luchadores to get the recognition they deserve as some of Mexico's important cultural figures.

Awards 
 1982: Photographic Biennal award, Mexico
 1984: Libro Propositivo Award, Mexico
 1988: Best Monument Award for commemoration of 20th Anniversary of Tlatelolco massacre, with the group Proceso Pentagono, Mexico
 1988: Best Book Award, Juan Pablos Editions, Mexico 
 1992: International Award, Latin American Emancipation and Identity 1492–1992, contest, Quito, Equador
 1995-1998 Sistema Nacional de Creadores de Arte (SNCA) Grant, Secretariat of Culture, Mexico
 1996: Banff Centre for Arts and Creativity Residency, Canada
 1999-2001: SNCA Grant, Secretariat of Culture, Mexico
 2001: Yaddo Residency, United States
 2002: MacDowell Residency, United States
 2003: Bellagio Residency, Italy
 2005-2006: FONCA grant, Mexico
 2007: MacDowell Residency, United States
 2010-2011: FONCA grant, Mexico

Solo exhibitions

Theatre, film, and video

Collections 
 Brooklyn Museum, Brooklyn, USA
 Fundación Cultural Televisa, Mexico
 Centro de la Imagen, México City, Mexico
 Harry Ransom Center, University of Texas at Austin, Austin, USA
 Musée du Quai Branly, Paris, France
 The Museum of Fine Arts, Houston, USA
 San Francisco Museum of Modern Art, San Francisco, USA
 Museum of Latin American Art, Long Beach, USA

Publications
 1982: Se Escoge el Tiempo. Los Talleres, México City.
 1984: Luciérnagas (a published collection of loose photographs). E.N.A.P. México City.
 1987: Bodas de Sangre. Tabasco County Government.
 1996: Santo y Seña de los Recintos Históricos de la Universidad de México. .
 2005: Lourdes Grobet. Turner Publicaciones, Spain. .
 2005: Lucha Libre: Masked Superstars of Mexican Wrestling. .
 2007: Retratos de Familia. Reverté Editores, Mexico/Spain. .
 2008: Espectacular de Lucha Libre. Trilce Editions, México City. .
 2008: Lucha Libre Mexicana (with Gabriel Rodríguez)

References
+
Derbez, Eréndira. ‘We Are Divided by Imaginaries Lines. La Fotografía y Los Mapas En Bering. Equilibrio y Resistencia, de Lourdes Grobet’. El Ojo Que Piensa. Revista de Cine Iberoamericano 20 (June 2020). http://elojoquepiensa.cucsh.udg.mx/index.php/elojoquepiensa/article/view/320.

External links 
  
  "La máscara en la cultura y la política mexicana", text by Lourdes Grobet dealing with her work on Lucha libre
  "Espectacular de Lucha Libre", presentation on the editor's site 
  "Lucha Libre. Masked Superstars of Mexican Wrestling" Presentation of the American edition of the book on the site Photo-eye
  "Lourdes Grobet: The Woman Behind the Masks", by Joe Hilliard

1940 births
2022 deaths
20th-century Mexican women artists
20th-century Mexican photographers
Sports photographers
Mexican people of French descent
Mexican women photographers
Alumni of Cardiff School of Art and Design
20th-century women photographers
Artists from Mexico City
21st-century Mexican women artists
21st-century Mexican photographers
21st-century women photographers